The Chernigov electoral district was a constituency created for the 1917 Russian Constituent Assembly election.

The electoral district covered the Chernigov Governorate. Chernigov was an agrarian province. The Bolshevik Party was absent in most uezds and weak in others. But returning soldiers, about a quarter of the electorate, boosted the Bolshevik vote.

Results

References

Electoral districts of the Russian Constituent Assembly election, 1917
1910s elections in Ukraine